Mitsushima, also known as Matsushima, Tokyo No. 2 Detached Camp, Tokyo #3B, and Tokyo 20, was a prisoner of war camp that provided labour to build the Hiraoka Dam on the Tenryū River in the Central Highlands in Japan.

Tatsuo Tsuchiya (also known as "Little Glass Eye") was the first Japanese to be convicted of war crimes at the Yokohama War Crimes Trials. Six guards, including the commander, were executed whilst another four guards (including Tsuchiya) received life sentences for causing the deaths of 48 prisoners.

See also
 Kanose POW Camp
 Tofuku Maru
 List of POW camps in Japan

External links
 Roger Mansell page on Mitsushima POW Camp

References

Japanese prisoner of war and internment camps